The Angel Maker's Wife is Camilla Läckberg's eighth book in her Fjällbacka series, and was published in Sweden on 19 December 2011.

Plot
In April 1974 there is a disappearance of a family without a trace from the island Valö just outside Fjällbacka: an Easter buffet is in the dining room and a baby (Ebba) is found wandering the house alone.;. Two parallel stories, one past/one present, where the past explains the present. Ebba and her husband Mårten have lost a son, and in an attempt to overcome the sadness they decide to open a bed and breakfast.

References

Swedish crime novels
Novels by Camilla Läckberg
Novels set in Sweden
2011 Swedish novels
Fiction set in 1974
Novels set in the 1970s
Västra Götaland County
Novels set on islands
Bokförlaget Forum books